Ali (Persian: علی) or, Ali of Ghazna (علی غزنه) was a Sultan of the Ghaznavid Empire, he succeeded from his nephew Mas'ud II, and he was the son of Mas'ud I, he ruled for short period (1048–1049), Although Abdur Rashid sent an army led by his vizier to Sistan to arrest Ghaznavi , the vizier changed sides and defeated Ali and replaced him with Abd al-Rashid and he was killed in 1050.

References 

Ghaznavid rulers
11th-century rulers in Asia
1049 deaths
Year of birth unknown